Mosahary (also Baghlary) is a surname found among the Boro people of north-eastern India. Mosahary comes from the word Mosa-ároi, meaning Tiger-folk and Baghlary is Sanskrit term for Mosahary.

Notable people 
People with this surname include:

Ranjit Shekhar Mooshahary - Former Director Generalof BSF, Former Governor of Meghalaya

See also
Boro people
Bodo Sahitya Sabha
Boro language

References 

Occupational surnames
Surnames of Indian origin
Bodo-language surnames